Characiformes  is an order of ray-finned fish, comprising the characins and their allies. Grouped in 18 recognized families,  more than 2000 different species are described, including the well-known piranha and tetras.

Taxonomy
The Characiformes form part of a series called the Otophysi within the superorder Ostariophysi. The Otophysi contain three other orders, Cypriniformes, Siluriformes, and Gymnotiformes. The Characiformes form a group known as the Characiphysi with the Siluriformes and Gymnotiformes. The order Characiformes is the sister group to the orders Siluriformes and Gymnotiformes, though this has been debated in light of recent molecular evidence.

Originally, the characins were all grouped within a single family, the Characidae. Since then, and also 18 different families have been separated out. However, classification varies somewhat, and the most recent (2011) study confirms the circumscribed Characidae as monophyletic.  Currently, 18 families, about 270 genera, and at least 1674 species are known. The suborder Citharinoidei, which contains the families Distichodontidae and Citharinidae, is considered the sister group to the rest of the characins, suborder Characoidei.

Evolution
The oldest characiform is Santanichthys of the early Cretaceous (Albian stage) of Brazil. While all extant species are of fresh water, this species was probably either brackish or marine. Many other fossils are also known. The Characiformes likely first diversified during the Cretaceous period, though fossils are poorly known. During the Cretaceous period, the rift between South America and Africa would be forming; this may explain the contrast in diversity between the two continents. Their low diversity in Africa may explain why some primitive fish families and the Cypriniformes coexist with them while they are absent in South America, where these fish may have been driven extinct. The characiforms had not spread into Africa soon enough to also reach the land bridge between Africa and Asia. The earliest they could have spread into Central America was the late Miocene.

Phylogeny
Below is a phylogeny of living Characiformes based on Betancur-Rodriguez et al. 2017 and Nelson, Grande & Wilson 2016.

Description
Characins possess a Weberian apparatus, a series of bony parts connecting the swim bladder and inner ear. Superficially, the Characiformes somewhat resemble their relatives of the order Cypriniformes, but have a small, fleshy adipose fin between the dorsal fin and tail. Most species have teeth within the mouth, since they are often carnivorous. The body is almost always covered in well-defined scales. The mouth is also usually not truly protractile.

Many members are under .

Distribution and habitat
Characins are most diverse in the Neotropics, where they are found in lakes and rivers throughout most of South and Central America. The red-bellied piranha, a member of the family Serrasalmidae within the Characiformes, is endemic to the Neotropical realm. At least 209 species of characins are found in Africa, including the distichodontids, citharinids, alestiids, and hepsetids. The rest of the characins originate from the Americas.

Relationship to humans
A few characins become quite large, and are important as food or game. Most, however, are small shoaling fish. Many species known as tetras are popular in aquaria due to their bright colors, general hardiness, and tolerance towards other fish in community tanks.

References

 
Ostariophysi
Ray-finned fish orders
Fish of Africa
Fish of South America
Fish of Central America
Extant Albian first appearances